Barbara Woolworth Hutton (November 14, 1912 – May 11, 1979) was an American debutante, socialite, heiress, and philanthropist. She was dubbed the "Poor Little Rich Girl"—first when she was given a lavish and expensive debutante ball in 1930 amid the Great Depression, and later due to a notoriously troubled private life.

Heiress to one-third of the estate of the retail tycoon Frank Winfield Woolworth, Barbara Hutton was one of the wealthiest women in the world. She endured a childhood marked by the neglect of her father and the early loss of her mother at age four who died from suffocation due to mastoiditis. Rumors have persisted that she committed suicide. This set the stage for a life of difficulty forming relationships. Married and divorced seven times, she acquired grand foreign titles but was maliciously treated and often exploited by several of her husbands. Publicly she was much envied for her possessions, her beauty and her apparent life of leisure; privately she remained deeply insecure, often taking refuge in drink, drugs, and playboys.

Hutton had one child, Lance Reventlow, with her second husband, but was an inconsistent and insecure parent and the subsequent divorce ended in a bitter custody battle. She later developed anorexia nervosa and perhaps thereby prevented further childbirth. Her son died in a plane crash in 1972 at the age of 36, leaving her devastated. She died on May 11, 1979, at age 66. At her death, the formerly wealthy Hutton was on the verge of bankruptcy as a result of both lavish spending and exploitation by those entrusted to manage her estate.

Early life
Born in New York City, Barbara Hutton was the only child of Edna Woolworth (1883–1917), who was a daughter of Frank W. Woolworth, the founder of the successful Woolworth five-and-dime stores. Barbara's father was Franklyn Laws Hutton (1877–1940), a wealthy co-founder of E. F. Hutton & Company (owned by Franklyn's brother Edward Francis Hutton), a respected New York investment banking and stock brokerage firm. She was a niece by marriage of cereal heiress Marjorie Merriweather Post, who was for a time (1920–1935) married to E.F. Hutton; thus their daughter, actress-heiress Dina Merrill (born Nedenia Hutton), was a first cousin to Barbara Hutton. Merrill related on A&E's Biography that for a time Barbara lived with them following the death of her mother and abandonment by her father.

Edna Hutton reportedly died on May 2, 1917, age 33, from suffocation due to mastoiditis, but rumor persists that she committed suicide by poison in despair over her husband's philandering, especially as the coroner decided that no autopsy was necessary. Four-year-old Barbara discovered her mother's body. After her mother's death, she lived with various relatives, and was raised by a governess. Hutton attended Miss Hewitt's Classes, now The Hewitt School in New York's Lenox Hill neighborhood and Miss Porter's School for Girls in Farmington, Connecticut. She became an introverted child who had limited interaction with other children of her own age. Her closest friend and only confidante was her cousin Jimmy Donahue, the son of her mother's sister. Jimmy Donahue inherited a portion of the Woolworth estate with Barbara and also grew up to have notorious, and public, drug, alcohol and relationship problems.

In 1924, Barbara Hutton's grandmother Jennie (Creighton) Woolworth died and bequeathed to her $26.1 million. Another $2.1 million in stock from Edna's inheritance was placed in a separate trust - both trusts were administered by Franklyn Hutton. By the time of her 21st birthday in 1933, Barbara Hutton's father had increased her inheritance to $42 million ($966,549,230.77 in 2023) not including the additional $8 million from her mother's estate, making her one of the wealthiest women in the world.

In accordance with New York's high society traditions, Barbara Hutton was given a lavish débutante ball in 1930 on her 18th birthday, where guests from the Astor and Rockefeller families, amongst other elites, were entertained by stars such as Rudy Vallee and Maurice Chevalier. The ball cost $60,000, a veritable fortune in the days of the Depression. Public criticism was so severe that she was sent on a tour of Europe to escape the onslaught of the press.

She lived in the family home at 4 East 80th Street on the Upper East Side.

Marriages

Popular poet Ogden Nash then took note of Hutton's public private life in the following light verse:

Said Aimee McPherson to Barbara Hutton,
"How do you get a marriage to button?"
"You'll have to ask some other person."
Said Barbara Hutton to Aimee McPherson

Barbara Hutton married:
 1933: Alexis Mdivani, a self-styled Georgian prince, divorced 1935
 1935: Count Kurt Heinrich Eberhard Erdmann Georg von Haugwitz-Hardenberg-Reventlow, divorced 1938
 1942: Cary Grant, divorced 1945
 1947: Prince Igor Troubetzkoy, divorced 1951
 1953: Porfirio Rubirosa, divorced 1954
 1955: Baron Gottfried Alexander Maximilian Walter Kurt von Cramm, divorced 1959
 1964: Pierre Raymond Doan, divorced 1966

Alexis Mdivani
 
 
Her first husband, used her great wealth to his advantage. As a social climber, he and his siblings were part of the "Marrying Mdivanis" from Georgia who claimed to be "princes" after they fled Tbilisi in 1921 due to the Soviet invasion of Georgia. Alexis was already married to Louise Van Alen, a friend Barbara met at Bailey's Beach in Rhode Island and a member of the Astor family, when he met Barbara in Biarritz, France. Their meeting was engineered by Alexis' manipulative sister Roussie who was always propelling her family into wealthy marriages even if a divorce was required. Roussie and Alexis devised a plan that would enable Alexis to divorce Louise, seduce Barbara, and force her into marriage all at once when Alexis, Louise, Barbara, Roussie, and others were visiting San Sebastian, Spain. Roussie timed Louise and other witnesses to a visit a guest cottage while Alexis seduced Barbara. The group caught the couple, prompting Barbara to flee to Paris to avoid facing the scandal, but Roussie threatened Barbara with negative publicity if she did not marry her brother. Alexis and Barbara were married on June 22, 1933, in the Russian Orthodox Church in Paris, France. Barbara's father provided a $1 million dowry. After spending millions of Barbara's inheritance on a home, polo ponies, clothes and men's jewelry, Alexis and Barbara divorced in March 1935.

Kurt Haugwitz-Reventlow
Count Kurt Haugwitz-Reventlow, with whom she had her only child, a son named Lance, was her second husband. Reventlow dominated her through verbal and physical abuse, which escalated to a savage beating that left her hospitalized and put him in jail. He also persuaded her to give up her American citizenship, and to take his native Danish citizenship for tax purposes, which she did in December 1937 in a New York federal court. At this point she lapsed into drug abuse. Hutton then developed anorexia, which would plague her for the rest of her life and would leave her unable to have further children. Lance Reventlow, the son, became a race car driver and builder of his own well-respected sports car, the Scarab, in the golden age of American sports car racing.

Hutton's divorce from Reventlow gave her custody of their son after a bitter court dispute. As her father had done, she left the raising of her child to a governess and private boarding schools.

In 1938, Hutton had a brief affair with Howard Hughes in London at the Savoy Hotel, where Hughes spent several afternoons with Hutton.    Hughes, at the time, was engaged to Katharine Hepburn and had come to London to meet with government officials and arrange permission to overfly Europe as part of a plan to circumnavigate the globe by air. Hutton later recalled that "he felt he must absolutely be in control of a situation."

Hughes had met Hepburn on the set of one of Cary Grant's movies, while visiting with Grant. Howard Hughes and Cary Grant were close, long-time friends.

Cary Grant
As World War II threatened in 1939, Hutton moved to California. She was active during the war, giving money to assist the Free French Forces and donating her yacht to the Royal Navy. Using her high-profile image to sell war bonds, she received positive publicity after being derided by the press as a result of her marriage scandals. In Hollywood, she met Cary Grant, one of the biggest movie stars of the day, and later married him on July 8, 1942. The press dubbed the married couple "Cash and Cary", though Grant did not need her money nor did he need to benefit from her name, and he appeared to genuinely care for Hutton. Nevertheless, this marriage also failed. Grant did not seek or receive any money from Hutton in their divorce settlement.

Igor Troubetzkoy
Hutton left California and moved to Paris, France, before acquiring a palace in Tangier. Hutton then began dating Igor Troubetzkoy, an expatriate Russian prince of very limited means but world renown. In the spring of 1948 in Zurich, Switzerland, she married him. That year, he was the driver of the first Ferrari to ever compete in Grand Prix motor racing when he raced in the Monaco Grand Prix, and later won the Targa Florio. He ultimately filed for divorce. Hutton's subsequent attempted suicide made headlines around the world. Labeled by the press as the "Poor Little Rich Girl", her life made great copy and the media exploited her for consumption by a fascinated public.

Porfirio Rubirosa
Her next marriage, lasting 53 days (December 30, 1953 – February 20, 1954), was to Dominican diplomat Porfirio Rubirosa, a notorious international playboy who meanwhile continued his affair with actress Zsa Zsa Gabor. She was granted Dominican citizenship in 1953.

In a scathing review of the marriage ceremony in the Milwaukee Sentinel, Phyllis Battelle coined the oft-quoted phrase: "The bride, for her fifth wedding, wore black and carried a scotch-and-soda."

Hutton then spent time with Americans James Douglas and Philip Van Rensselaer. Her lavish spending continued; already the owner of several mansions around the world, in 1959 she built a luxurious Japanese-style palace on a 30-acre (120,000 m2) estate in Cuernavaca, Mexico.

Gottfried von Cramm
Her next husband was an old friend, German tennis star Baron Gottfried von Cramm. This marriage also ended in divorce. He later died in an automobile crash near Cairo, Egypt, in 1976.

Raymond Doan
In Tangier, Hutton met her seventh husband, Prince Pierre Raymond Doan Vinh na Champassak. This marriage, too, was short-lived. Raymond Doan was an adopted member of the former royal family of the Kingdom of Champasak (roughly located in modern Laos).

Other relationships
Hutton lived with Frederick McEvoy, purchasing a chalet at a ski resort in Franconia, New Hampshire, after her marriage to actor Cary Grant. The couple never married and remained friends until McEvoy's death in 1951.
Hutton frequently appeared intoxicated in public and was notorious throughout her life for lavish spending. She was known to make gifts to total strangers.

Art and jewelry
Over the years, apart from an important inheritance which included Old Master paintings and important sculptures, she also personally acquired a magnificent collection of her own which included the spectrum of arts, porcelain, valuable jewelry, including elaborate historic pieces that had once belonged to Marie Antoinette and Empress Eugénie of France, and important pieces by Fabergé and Cartier.

Final years and death

The death of her only son Lance Reventlow in an air crash in 1972 sent Hutton into a state of despair. By this time, her fortune had diminished, due to her extreme generosity, including donating Winfield House to the United States government as a residence for its UK ambassador. Alleged questionable deals by her longtime lawyer, Graham Mattison, also ate away at her fortune. Eventually she began liquidating assets in order to raise funds to live, yet continued to spend money on strangers willing to pay a little attention to her. She spent her final years in Los Angeles, living at the Beverly Wilshire Hotel, where she died from a heart attack in May 1979, aged 66. One biographer wrote that, at her death, $3,500 was all that remained of her fortune, but some who actually knew her said that was not the case. She was interred in the Woolworth family mausoleum at Woodlawn Cemetery in The Bronx, New York.

In popular culture 

 Poor Little Rich Girl: The Barbara Hutton Story (1987), based on David Heymann's biography, a television miniseries starring Farrah Fawcett as Barbara Hutton with Fairuza Balk portraying her at age 12 and Matilda Johansson at age 5.  James Read portrays Cary Grant. 
 Phantom Thread (2018), set in 1950s London a haute couture dressmaker (played by Daniel Day-Lewis) struggles with inspiration and relationships.  The character Barbara Rose is inspired by Barbara Hutton around the time of her marriage with Rubirosa. 
 Rubirosa (2018), a Mexican web television series co-starring Gabriela de la Garza as Barbara Hutton. 
 As The Money Burns (2020-present), a history podcast reconstructing the Great Depression through the lives of heirs and heiresses.  As a primary heiress, Barbara appears in multiple episodes beginning with the second episode "Welcome to Newport, Part 1" which covers the summer before the 1929 Wall Street Crash.  Other episodes include her debutante ball, her bow at Buckingham Palace, and other key events and moments in her life.

See also
 Woolworths
 Lady Hutton
 List of people from Morelos, Mexico

Notes

Further reading
Several books have been written about Barbara Hutton, the best known of which are:

 Barbara Hutton: A Candid Biography, by Dean Jennings (F. Fell, 1968, 301pp.)
 Million Dollar Baby: An Intimate Portrait of Barbara Hutton, by Philip Van Rensselaer (Putnam, 1979, 285pp.)
 Poor Little Rich Girl: The Life and Legend of Barbara Hutton, by C. David Heymann (L. Stuart, 1984, 390pp.)
 In Search of a Prince: My Life with Barbara Hutton, by Mona Eldridge (Sidgwick & Jackson, 1988, 210pp.)

A bibliography:

In 1987, a television motion picture titled Poor Little Rich Girl: The Barbara Hutton Story starred Farrah Fawcett in the role of Barbara Hutton.

External links
 

1912 births
1979 deaths
American billionaires
American socialites
American debutantes
Burials at Woodlawn Cemetery (Bronx, New York)
Hutton family
People from the Upper East Side
Naturalized citizens of the Dominican Republic
Princesses by marriage
Woolworth family
Hewitt School alumni
Miss Porter's School alumni
20th-century American women
20th-century American people
Racing drivers' wives and girlfriends